The Regen is a river in Bavaria, Germany, and shortly in the Czech Republic. It is a left tributary of the Danube, at Regensburg, Germany.

Etymology
The name in German evolved from the name in Latin, but its meaning is unknown. The Romans called the river variously Regana (feminine gender), Reganus (masculine), and Reganum (neuter).

Geography
The river crosses the Czech-German border after few kilometres, at Bayerisch Eisenstein.

At Zwiesel, the Great Regen is joined by the Kleiner Regen ("Little Regen") to form the Schwarzer Regen ("Black Regen"). The Schwarzer Regen flows through Regen and Viechtach, and is joined by the Weißer Regen ("White Regen") in Bad Kötzting. Beyond this confluence, the river is called Regen. The Kleiner Regen crosses the Frauenau Reservoir.

The Regen Valley forms the main valley crossing the Bavarian Forest; many settlements within the mountains are located along the river. Cities along the Regen river include Cham and Regensburg.

See also
 Regen (city in Germany)
 List of rivers of Bavaria
 List of rivers of the Czech Republic

Sources 
 Franz Bogner: Der Regen. Ein Luftbildporträt vom Arber bis Regensburg. Pustet, Regensburg 2007,  (Bildband). 
 Bärbel Kleindorfer-Marx (Hrsg.): Der Regen. Kultur und Natur am Fluss. Buch & Kunstverlag Oberpfalz, Amberg 1996, .

References

External links 
 

 
Rivers of Bavaria
Bavarian Forest
Federal waterways in Germany
Bohemian Forest
Rivers of Germany
Rivers of the Czech Republic